Mafia is an Indian streaming television series released in the year 2020 directed by Birsa Dasgupta.The series is written by Aniruddha Dasgupta, Rohan Ghose and Aritra Sen. Mafia revolves around the story of a group of friends trying to discover their past as those events had a resonance in their present. They discover the truth through heinous acts exercised by them in the past.

Premise
Six friends and their partners embark on a bachelor party in the jungles of Madhupur. The group was inseparable during their college years, and Madhupur was their favorite weekend gig. But with time they grew apart. Betrayal, backstabbing and distrust led them on their separate ways.

Five years after their friendship was laid rest in the very place they return, each with a hidden agenda of their own. Centering on the popular parlor game ‘Mafia’, this is a gruesome psychological thriller that will keep its viewers on the edge. The aspects of the game spill out onto the life of its players and they are forced to confront and pay for their crimes.

Cast

Main 
Namit Das as Nitin Kumar
Tanmay Dhanania as Rishi
Saurabh Saraswat as Ritwik
Anindita Bose as Neha
Madhurima Roy as Tania
Aditya Bakshi as Sam
Riddhima Ghosh as Priyanka
Ishaa Saha as Ananya

Production

Development
On June 23, 2020, ZEE5 announced that Birsa Dasgupta directed the series alongside Parambrata Chatterjee who produced it. Production companies involved with the series are Eskay Movies, Roadshow Films and EmVeeBee Media (P) Ltd. The series premiered on July 10, 2020. Birsa Dasgupta along with his associate Shaket banerjee, Dop Gairik Sarkar and production designer Riddhie Basak was set to start shoot from the beginning of the year 2020.

Casting
The show will host stars like Namit Das, Tanmay Dhanania, Saurabh Saraswat, Anindita Bose, Madhurima Roy, Aditya Bakshi, Riddhima Ghosh and Ishaa Saha

Release
ZEE5 released the official trailer for the show on 27 June 2020 and it premiered on 10 July.

Episodes

Critical Reception
Mafia received mixed reviews from critics. Gripping narrative and thrilling plot shifts of the series were highlighted and appreciated.

The Indian Express explained that the series offered unlimited thrill that would always keep you at the edge of your seat. Hindustan Times appreciated the talented cast and the thrilling plot the combination of both which lifted the series to greater height .

Shikha Desai from Times Of India rated the series 3 out of 5 stars and wrote Its the plot which makes the series watchable however she had qualms with the execution for which she stated could have been better. Pratishruti Ganguly from Firstpost stated the execution of series as confusing, and wrote that the series shows glimmers of excellent plot but the conclusion disappoints.

References

External links 
 
 Mafia at ZEE5

Indian web series
Thriller web series